Elisa Manuela Brito Webba Torres, nicknamed Lilí (born May 25, 1965 in Luanda) is a retired Angolan handball player. She began her career at the Instituto Nacional de Educação Física (INEF) in 1982. In 1990 she moved to Petro Atlético where she won many titles. She has also been a prominent member and the captain of the Angola women's national handball team.

Summer Olympics
Lilí competed for Angola at the 1996, 2000 and 2004 Summer olympics.

References

External links
 

Angolan female handball players
1969 births
Living people
Handball players from Luanda
Olympic handball players of Angola
Handball players at the 1996 Summer Olympics
Handball players at the 2000 Summer Olympics
Handball players at the 2004 Summer Olympics